Patung Pemuda Membangun (translated as Youth Advancement Monument or simply Youth Monument) is a statue located at the southern end of Jalan Jenderal Sudirman, Jakarta, Indonesia. The statue marks the entrance to Kebayoran Baru subdistrict in South Jakarta.

Description
Patung Pemuda Membangun is a 25 meter Soviet-style dark-grey terrazzo statue which stands on a roundabout at the south end of Jalan Jenderal Sudirman. The roundabout marks the entrance to the Kebayoran Baru subdistrict in South Jakarta. The statue was erected to inspire people to participate in the nation's building, especially the youths of the new nation. The name Pemuda Membangun ("Youth Advancement") was chosen to inspire young people. The design of the statue shows a near naked young man shouting while holding a plate containing a flame above his head, his sinews and muscles strain at full effort. The flaming plate symbolizes youth taking forth light into the future.

History
The statue was presented by Pertamina for the government of Jakarta to celebrate the 445th anniversary of Jakarta in 1971, at that time headed by Ibnu Sutowo.

The monument was designed by a team of sculptors known as Biro Insinyur Seniman Arsitektur (The Bureau of Engineer Artists Architecture) led by Imam Supardi. Munir Pamuncak was responsible for the construction. Construction of the monument started in July 1971. The construction was scheduled to be finished on October 28, 1971, in time for the celebration of the Youth Pledge Day. However completion was delayed until March 1972.

Construction of Jakarta MRT
The monument marks the transition between the elevated and the underground structure of the Jakarta Mass Rapid Transit. During the construction of the transition area, cut-and-cover construction of the box culvert tunnel had to commence below the statue. A temporary steel frame structure was built to protect the statue during the digging of the ground below. This protection structure consists of an H-beam kingpost, bracings, angle brackets, and a borepile at the bottom of the kingpost. After the completion of the work, this temporary protection structure was demolished and the ground foundation of the statue refilled on top of the MRT's box culvert tunnel.

Popular culture
English-speaking foreigners call it the "Pizza Man" or "Hot-Hands Harry".  Some Indonesians called it "Aduh, Panas" ("Ouch, Hot"). Other nickname for the monument is "Pertamina", referring to the national oil company which takes energy out of the ground and burns it in the air.

See also

Kebayoran Baru

References

Cited works 

 

Buildings and structures completed in 1972
Monuments and memorials in Indonesia
Buildings and structures in Jakarta
South Jakarta